Steven Neil Gilborn (July 15, 1936 – January 2, 2009) was an American actor and educator.

Gilborn was born in New Rochelle, New York. He attended Swarthmore College, where he was awarded a bachelor's degree in English and earned a Ph.D. in dramatic literature from Stanford University in 1969, where his dissertation provided a psychoanalytic perspective on the plays of the 19th-century French dramatist Émile Augier.

Before becoming an actor, Gilborn was a professor of humanities at the Massachusetts Institute of Technology and faculty adviser to the Gilbert and Sullivan Society. He also taught at Stanford University, Columbia University and at the University of California, Berkeley. He was married to American landscape photographer Karen Halverson.

Gilborn guest-starred in a number of notable television series, including Columbo (4 episodes), Perfect Strangers, Boy Meets World, The Golden Girls,  Malcolm in the Middle, Touched by an Angel, JAG, ER, The West Wing, Matlock, L.A. Law, The Practice, Law & Order, NYPD Blue and The Wonder Years.

He had a recurring role in the sitcom Ellen (as "Harold Morgan", Ellen's father). Another notable recurring role was his three-episode stint as "Mr. Collins", Kevin Arnold's algebra teacher on The Wonder Years. Film credits include "Mr. Phillips" in The Brady Bunch Movie and the hotel owner in Joyride.

Gilborn died at age 72 on January 2, 2009, of cancer at his home in North Chatham, New York.

Filmography

Film

Television

Video games

References

External links

1936 births
2009 deaths
20th-century American male actors
21st-century American male actors
20th-century American educators
American male film actors
American male television actors
Deaths from cancer in New York (state)
Columbia University faculty
MIT School of Humanities, Arts, and Social Sciences faculty
Male actors from New Rochelle, New York
Stanford University alumni
Stanford University faculty
Swarthmore College alumni
University of California, Berkeley faculty